El Sol is the common name for the "Latin American Advertising Festival", which is held annually in Spain.

The festival, which takes place by the end of May, is organised by the Spanish Association of Advertising Agencies (AEAP) and
is aimed at promoting advertising creativity.

Golden Sun

Each year works form Latin American countries along with Portugal and the Latin community in USA, compete in 
the contest to get the golden sun awards (Sol de Oro in Spanish).

External links
Official webpage (in Spanish)
Latin American Advertising Festival on Euskadi.net

Festivals in Spain